The Mind of a Chef is a non-fiction television series on PBS narrated and executive produced by Anthony Bourdain, and combines travel, cooking, history, and science. Each season follows a different chef, or pair of chefs, and examines their beliefs and philosophies on cooking and the culinary arts.

The first season premiered on November 9, 2012, with host David Chang. Season 2 premiered on September 7, 2013, and starred chefs Sean Brock and April Bloomfield. Season 3 premiered on September 6, 2014, and stars chefs Edward Lee and Magnus Nilsson. Chefs Gabrielle Hamilton and David Kinch were featured in Season 4.  Season 5 featured chef Ludo Lefebvre.

In 2017, Zero Point Zero Production released the sixth season, featuring chef Danny Bowien, on Facebook Watch. It premiered on November 13, 2017.

Episodes

Season 1 (2012)

Season 2 (2013)

Season 3 (2014)

Season 4 (2015)

Season 5 (2016–17)

Season 6 (2017)

Reception

Awards and nominations
In 2013 & 2014, The Mind of a Chef won a James Beard Foundation Award for Best Television Program, On Location.

See also
List of original programs distributed by Facebook Watch

References

External links 

2010s American cooking television series
2012 American television series debuts
Daytime Emmy Award for Outstanding Culinary Program winners
Facebook Watch original programming
James Beard Foundation Award winners
PBS original programming